The unnormalized modified Korteweg–de Vries (KdV) equation is an integrable nonlinear partial differential equation：

 

where  is an arbitrary (nonzero) constant. See also Korteweg–de Vries equation.

This is a special case of the Gardner equation.

References

Graham W. Griffiths, William E. Shiesser Traveling Wave Analysis of Partial Differential Equations, Academy Press

Nonlinear partial differential equations
Integrable systems